The term RF-5B may refer to:
Fournier RF 5, a French motorglider design
Northrop F-5, the reconnaissance version of the American fighter aircraft design